Francisco Peralta Osorno (28 September 1943 – 18 March 2020) was a Spanish archer. He competed in the men's individual event at the 1980 Summer Olympics.

Notes

References

External links
 

1943 births
2020 deaths
Spanish male archers
Olympic archers of Spain
Archers at the 1980 Summer Olympics
Sportspeople from Huelva